Budza may refer to:

Budza language
Serhiy Budza